Tveitevåg is a village in Askøy municipality in Vestland county, Norway.  The village is located along the Hauglandsosen bay on the western coast of the island of Askøy.  The village surrounds the lake Storavatnet, just east of the Kollevågen nature reserve.  Tveit Church is located in the village.  Historically, the area was home to a large mill, but it is now closed.

References

Villages in Vestland
Askøy